USNS Brittin (T-AKR-305) is a Bob Hope-class roll on roll off vehicle cargo ship of the United States Navy. She was built by Northrop Grumman Ship Systems, New Orleans and delivered to the Navy on 30 January 2001. They assigned her to the United States Department of Defense's Military Sealift Command. Brittin is named for Medal of Honor recipient Sergeant First Class Nelson V. Brittin, and is one of 11 Surge LMSRs operated by a private company under contract to the Military Sealift Command. She is assigned to the MSC Atlantic surge force and is maintained in Ready Operational Status 4.

References

Further reading

Bob Hope-class vehicle cargo ships
Auxiliary ships of the United States
2000 ships
Ships built in New Orleans